The Rund um den Sachsenring is a one-day cycling race held annually in Germany. It was part of UCI Europe Tour in category 1.2 from 2005 to 2008.

Winners

External links
 

Cycle races in Germany
UCI Europe Tour races
Recurring sporting events established in 2004
2004 establishments in Germany
Hohenstein-Ernstthal